Simod is an Italian sportswear manufacturer, based in Piove di Sacco. The company specialises in sports footwear, such as training shoes, running shoes and football boots, although they also design casual footwear not intended for use in sport.

Simod sponsored the English Full Members Cup professional football competition from 1987 to 1989, during which time the competition was known as the Simod Cup.

Minardi Formula One (1985–1993)

Amongst other sponsorships, they were a named sponsor of the Italian Minardi Formula 1 team for a number of years during the 1980s.

References

Sporting goods manufacturers of Italy
Italian brands
Companies based in Veneto
Shoe brands
Shoe companies of Italy